Bridgend is a constituency of the Senedd. It elects one Member of the Senedd by the first past the post method of election. Also, however, it is one of seven constituencies in the South Wales West electoral region, which elects four additional members, in addition to seven constituency members, to produce a degree of proportional representation for the region as a whole.

History

Bridgend can be considered a relatively safe Labour seat. The former First Minister Carwyn Jones had represented the constituency since the creation of the assembly until 2021. The former Secretary of State for Wales Alun Cairns contested the seat in 1999 and 2003.

Boundaries

The constituency was created for the first election to the Assembly, in 1999, with the name and boundaries of the Bridgend Westminster constituency. It is partly within the preserved county of Mid Glamorgan and partly within the preserved county of South Glamorgan.

The other six constituencies of the region are Aberavon, Gower, Neath, Ogmore, Swansea East and Swansea West.

Voting
In general elections for the Senedd, each voter has two votes. The first vote may be used to vote for a candidate to become the Member of the Senedd for the voter's constituency, elected by the first past the post system. The second vote may be used to vote for a regional closed party list of candidates. Additional member seats are allocated from the lists by the d'Hondt method, with constituency results being taken into account in the allocation.

Members of the Senedd
Between 1999 and 2021, the member for the constituency was Carwyn Jones, who became First Minister of Wales in 2009 and served until 2018. In 2021, Sarah Murphy became the MS.

Elections

Elections in the 2020s 

Regional Ballot void votes: 182. Want of an Official Mark (2), Voting for more than ONE party or individual candidate (48), Writing or mark by which the Voter could be identified (1), Unmarked or Void for uncertainty (131)

Elections in the 2010s

Regional ballots rejected: 195

Elections in the 2000s

2003 Electorate: 62,540
Regional ballots rejected: 319

Elections in the 1990s

Notes

References

Senedd constituencies in the South Wales West electoral region
Politics of Bridgend County Borough
1999 establishments in Wales
Constituencies established in 1999